Tharusha Fernando (born 5 June 1999) is a Sri Lankan cricketer. He made his Twenty20 debut for Panadura Sports Club in the 2018–19 SLC Twenty20 Tournament on 15 February 2019. He made his List A debut for Panadura Sports Club in the 2018–19 Premier Limited Overs Tournament on 4 March 2019.

References

External links
 

1999 births
Living people
Sri Lankan cricketers
Panadura Sports Club cricketers
Sri Lanka Navy Sports Club cricketers
Sportspeople from Moratuwa